The Iowa Federation of Colored Women's Clubs (IFCWC) was an umbrella organization serving African-American women's clubs in Iowa. The motto of IFCWC was "Sowing Seeds of Kindness", and the organization was affiliated with the National Association of Colored Women. The club produced a journal called the Iowa Colored Woman. IFCWC sent delegates to represent the state at national conventions and opportunities such as "Colored Women's day" at the 1939 New York World's Fair. The IFCWC is also known for creating a black women's dormitory for the University of Iowa before the school was fully integrated. The building has been listed on the National Register of Historic Places.

About 
The IFCWC was created in May 1902 and was at first known as the Iowa Association of Colored Women's Clubs. The first convention met in Ottumwa with only a few women and their clubs attending. The first president was Helen Downey. By 1904, there were 300 women attending the annual conference and clubs from all cities large enough to support them sent representatives. By 1914, the IFCWC represented 40 different African-American women's clubs in Iowa. Also in that year, the IFCWC created a committee dedicated to women's suffrage, which was headed by Teresa Adams.

Iowa Federation Home for Colored Girls
In 1912, it was proposed by the president of IFCWC, Mrs. J.B. Rush, that a home for black working women be established. In 1919, the IFCWC purchased a home, known later as the "Federation Home", at 942 Iowa Avenue in Iowa City. White neighbors protested the sale of a house to African Americans, successfully demanding that the lot's price be reassessed, causing IFCWC to pay more money for their purchase. In 1934, the home was renamed "Sue Brown Hall" after a prominent member of the IFCWC. The home allowed black women who wanted to attend the University of Iowa to have a place to stay, since they were not allowed in the dorms until 1947. The home closed in 1950. The building is protected as a local landmark in Iowa City, and it was listed on the National Register of Historic Places in 2019.

Notable members 

 Sue M. Wilson Brown.

References

Citations

Sources

External links 
 IFCWC convention schedule, 1910
 Proceedings of the Eighteenth Annual Session of the Iowa Federation of Colored Women's Clubs, 1919
 Iowa Federation Home, 1929

1902 establishments in Iowa
African-American history of Iowa
Women's clubs in the United States
National Association of Colored Women's Clubs
Women's organizations based in the United States
Women's suffrage advocacy groups in the United States
National Register of Historic Places in Iowa City, Iowa
Women in Iowa